The Arsenal de Rochefort was a French naval base and dockyard in the town of Rochefort. It was founded in 1665 and it was closed in 1926.

In December 1665 Rochefort was chosen by Jean-Baptiste Colbert as a place of "refuge, defense and supply" for the French Navy. Its military harbour was fortified by Louis XIV's Commissary of Fortifications Sébastien Le Prestre de Vauban. Between 1666 and 1669 the King had the Corderie Royale (then the longest building in Europe) constructed to make cordage for French ships of war.
The making of cordage ceased in 1867 and in 1926 the Arsenal de Rochefort was closed.

Gallery

See also 
 Raid on Rochefort, a 1757 British raid on Rochefort during the Seven Years' War.

References

External links

Installations of the French Navy
Rochefort, Charente-Maritime
1665 establishments in France
1926 disestablishments in France